Hope is a civil parish in the High Peak district of Derbyshire, England.  The parish contains 23 listed buildings that are recorded in the National Heritage List for England.  Of these, one is listed at Grade I, the highest of the three grades, and the others are at Grade II, the lowest grade.  The parish contains the village of Hope and the surrounding countryside.  Most of the listed buildings are houses, farmhouses and farm buildings.  The other listed buildings include a church and items in the churchyard, a cross converted into a guide post, a hotel, a former toll house, two mileposts, the engine house and chimney of a former lead mine, a school, and a war memorial.


Key

Buildings

References

Citations

Sources

 

Lists of listed buildings in Derbyshire